Foodhub (formerly known as Touch2Success) is a company that provides online food ordering services to restaurants and takeaways. It is headquartered in Stoke on Trent, United Kingdom. It was founded in 2008 by Ardian Mula and Mohammed Shakil.

The vision of the company is to automate and bring software to help restaurants run more efficiently. The company believes that by using technology, restaurants can streamline their operations and improve their customer experience. The company has developed a range of software tools and platforms that are designed to help restaurants manage their day-to-day activities, such as taking orders, tracking inventory, and analyzing sales data. These tools are easy to use and provide valuable insights that can help restaurants make informed decisions about their operations. Foodhub's goal is to become the leading provider of software solutions for the restaurant industry, helping businesses of all sizes to grow and succeed.

History 

The journey began in 2008 with the founding of touch2success, a product-based company specializing in the development of SaaS modules to help businesses manage their journey with customers. CEO Ardian Mula's passion for technology and enthusiasm for work led him to develop an online ordering platform at a young age, which later caught the attention of business owners of various restaurants and takeaways who were in need of such a solution to make their operations more efficient. The company initially focused on creating websites and epos for individual businesses with the main focus being creating unique websites for each customer and helping each business establish their online footprint at the fraction of the cost compared to other providers.

In 2020, Foodhub become the UK's fourth largest food ordering company, behind competitors Uber Eats,  Just Eat and Deliveroo.
In the same year, it was announced Foodhub had expanded its international presence into the Republic of Ireland and it now serves restaurants and takeaways / takeout clients in the UK, Australia, New Zealand, Republic of Ireland and the USA, with plans to expand into Canada mid-2023.

The launch of Foodhub's food portal in 2017 was a massive success and helped the company's partners receive more online orders at 0% commission. As a result of this success, the company decided to rebrand from Touch2Success to Foodhub in 2020. The new name better reflects the company's focus on providing an easy and convenient way for customers to order food online and have it delivered to their doorstep. The rebranding was met with enthusiasm by both customers and partners, and Foodhub has continues to grow and expand its reach since the change. The company's innovative approach to online food ordering has made it a leader in the industry and has helped it establish itself as a trusted and reliable source of food delivery.

Product List 
 Fusion EPOS
 MyTakeaway Management App
 Kitchen Display System 
 Self Ordering Kiosk
 Drive2success
 Whitelabel Apps & websites 
 Card payment machines

Acquisitions 
Foodhub has made several acquisitions in its efforts to expand its operations and reach new markets. 

In 2019, Foodhub acquired Big Foodie, a Chinese ordering app, to increase its presence in the UK market and specialize in Chinese cuisine. This acquisition led to a 25% increase in sales without any external funding.

Foodhub also expanded its services to Australia and acquired Eatappy, an Australian-based online platform, to strengthen its position in the country. 

In 2022, the company entered the US market and acquired orders2.me in late 2022 as part of its efforts to build a customer base in America. These acquisitions have helped Foodhub to solidify its position as a leading provider of food delivery services around the world.

References

British companies established in 2017
Retail companies established in 2017
Transport companies established in 2017
Internet properties established in 2017
Online food ordering